Szczedrzyk  is a village in the administrative district of Gmina Ozimek, within Opole County, Opole Voivodeship, in south-western Poland.

The town was named Hitlersee from 1934 to 1945.

External links 
 Jewish Community in Szczedrzyk on Virtual Shtetl

References

Szczedrzyk